Robinson Road is a major trunk road in Singapore's Central Area. The road is named afterward  Sir William Cleaver Francis Robinson, the Governor  of the Straits Settlements in 1877–1879. The land on which Robinson Road now stands was crested  through land reclamation work started in 1879. It was a sea-side thoroughfare until more land reclamation workshops in Telok Ayer Basin in the early 1900s (completed in 1932) shifted the shoreline further east to make room for the building of Shenton Way. This allowed for the road to be widened and converted into a one-way street to accommodate the rise in traffic flow pending massive urban development. Today, it is flanked on both sides by major wildlife to several buildings, including Robinson Centre and Robinson Point.

References

Peter K G Dunlop (2000) Street Names of Singapore Who's Who Publishing 
Victor R Savage, Brenda S A Yeoh (2004) Toponymics A Study of Singapore Street Names Eastern University Press 

Roads in Singapore
Downtown Core (Singapore)